A cleruchy (klēroukhia) in Classical Greece, was a specialized type of colony established by Athens. The term comes from the Greek word , klērouchos, literally "lot-holder".

History
Normally, Greek colonies were politically independent; they would have a special relationship with the mother city (the metropolis), but would otherwise be independent entities. Cleruchies were significantly different. The settlers or cleruchs would retain their Athenian citizenship, and the community remained a political dependency of Athens – a position reinforced by installing institutions of local government based on Athenian models, such as the council on Samos.

According to Plutarch, cleruchies were assigned to poor Athenian citizens, who would then live overseas while retaining their Athenian citizenship.  However, epigraphical evidence suggests that Athenian cleruchs were more commonly wealthy, and continued to live in Athens while slaves worked on their overseas estates.  Cleruchies thereby became a significant source of private wealth in Athens – the 3,000 kleroi on Lesbos provided 100 talents a year, according to Thucydides.

The first cleruchy is thought to have been Salamis, captured by Athens from Megara in the 6th century BC. Other cleruchies were established on the Thracian Chersonese following its recapture from the Persian Empire after the Greco-Persian Wars of the 5th century BC, and at Chalcis following that city's defeat in a war with Athens. During the period of the Delian League and the Second Athenian League (5th–4th century BC), many more cleruchies were created by Athens such as on Samos.  Athens' system of cleruchies reached its height in the late fifth century, at which point it stretched as far east as Amisos on the Black Sea.  This network of cleruchies was lost at the end of the Peloponnesian war, and never reached this extent again, although some cleruchies were re-established in the fourth century, for example at Lemnos and Samos.

References

Works cited

Further reading
 Endnotes:
 — but Brea is wrongly given as an example, as it was not a cleruchy but a colony (Hicks and Hill, 41 [29]).

Greek colonization
Athenian Empire